The Criminologist is the official newsletter of the American Society of Criminology. It was founded in 1976 and is published six times per year.

External links

Newsletters
Publications established in 1976
Bimonthly newspapers